Sigma Puppis, Latinized from σ Puppis, is a binary star system in the southern constellation of Puppis. It has an apparent visual magnitude of 3.25, which is bright enough to be visible to the naked eye at night from the Southern Hemisphere. Through a telescope, it appears as a bright, orange-hued star with a nearby white companion.

This is a spectroscopic binary system, consisting of an orbiting pair of stars that have not been individually resolved with a telescope. Their orbital period is 257.8 days and the eccentricity is 0.17. The pair form an eclipsing binary of the Beta Lyrae type and a period of 130.5 days, or one half of their orbital period. The eclipse of the primary component causes a decline of 0.04 of a magnitude, while the secondary eclipse reduces the magnitude by 0.03.

The combined stellar classification is K5 III, which matches the spectrum of a giant star. At the estimated distance of this system, this yields a physical size of about 107 times the radius of the Sun. The primary component shows the behavior of a slow irregular variable.

In addition to its binary components, Sigma Puppis has a more distant companion that has a matching proper motion, suggesting that it may be gravitationally bound to the binary. In 1970, American astronomer Olin J. Eggen suggested that Sigma Puppis belonged to a moving group of stars that share a similar motion through space, and thereby a common origin. It served as the eponym for this, the σ Puppis group. The existence of this group was later brought into question.

References

K-type giants
Beta Lyrae variables
Slow irregular variables
Spectroscopic binaries

Puppis
Puppis, Sigma
Durchmusterung objects
059717
036377
2878